Gomesa is a genus of flowering plants from the orchid family, Orchidaceae. It contains about 80–100 species, all native to South America.  The genus is abbreviated as Gom.

Species 
This genus contains many species that were previously assigned to Oncidium.

Species include:
 Gomesa adamantina  (Marçal & Cath.) M.W.Chase & N.H.Williams  (2009)
 Gomesa albinoi  (Schltr.) M.W.Chase & N.H.Williams (2009)
 Gomesa alpina  Porsch (1908)
 Gomesa barbaceniae  (Lindl.) M.W.Chase & N.H.Williams (2009)
 Gomesa barbata  (Lindl.) M.W.Chase & N.H.Williams (2009)
 Gomesa barkeri  (Hook.) Rolfe (1901)
 Gomesa bicolor  (Lindl.) M.W.Chase & N.H.Williams (2009)
 Gomesa bifolia  (Sims) M.W.Chase & N.H.Williams (2009)
 Gomesa blanchetii  (Rchb.f.) M.W.Chase & N.H.Williams (2009)
 Gomesa bohnkiana  (V.P.Castro & G.F.Carr) M.W.Chase & N.H.Williams (2009)
 Gomesa brasiliensis  (Rolfe) M.W.Chase & N.H.Williams (2009)
 Gomesa brieniana  (Rchb.f.) M.W.Chase & N.H.Williams (2009)
 Gomesa caldensis  (Rchb.f.) M.W.Chase & N.H.Williams (2009)
 Gomesa calimaniana  (Guiard) M.W.Chase & N.H.Williams (2009)
 Gomesa carlosregentii  Lückel (2010)
 Gomesa chapadensis  (V.P.Castro & Campacci) M.W.Chase & N.H.Williams (2009)
 Gomesa chrysoptera  (Lindl.) M.W.Chase & N.H.Williams (2009)
 Gomesa chrysopterantha  (Lückel) M.W.Chase & N.H.Williams (2009)
 Gomesa ciliata  (Lindl.) M.W.Chase & N.H.Williams (2009)
 Gomesa cogniauxiana  (Schltr.) M.W.Chase & N.H.Williams (2009)
 Gomesa colorata  (Königer & J.G.Weinm.) M.W.Chase & N.H.Williams (2009)
 Gomesa concolor  (Hook.) M.W.Chase & N.H.Williams (2009)
 Gomesa cornigera  (Lindl.) M.W.Chase & N.H.Williams (2009)
 Gomesa crispa  (Lindl.) Klotzsch ex Rchb.f. (1852)
 Gomesa croesus  (Rchb.f.) M.W.Chase & N.H.Williams (2009)
 Gomesa cruciata  (Rchb.f.) M.W.Chase & N.H.Williams (2009)
 Gomesa culuenensis  (Docha Neto & Benelli) Lückel (2010)
 Gomesa cuneata  (Scheidw.) M.W.Chase & N.H.Williams (2009)
 Gomesa damacenoi  (Chiron & V.P.Castro) M.W.Chase & N.H.Williams (2009)
 Gomesa dasytyle  (Rchb.f.) M.W.Chase & N.H.Williams (2009)
 Gomesa discifera  (Lindl.) M.W.Chase & N.H.Williams (2009)
 Gomesa divaricata  Hoffmanns. ex Schltr. (1926)
 Gomesa doeringii  (Hoehne) Pabst (1967)
 Gomesa doniana  (Bateman ex W.H.Baxter) M.W.Chase & N.H.Williams (2009)
 Gomesa duseniana  Kraenzl. (1921)
 Gomesa echinata  (Barb.Rodr.) M.W.Chase & N.H.Williams (2009)
 Gomesa edmundoi  (Pabst) M.W.Chase & N.H.Williams (2009)
 Gomesa eleutherosepala  (Barb.Rodr.) M.W.Chase & N.H.Williams (2009)
 Gomesa emiliana  H.Barbosa (1920)
 Gomesa emilii  (Schltr.) M.W.Chase & N.H.Williams (2009)
 Gomesa fischeri  Regel (1856)
 Gomesa flexuosa  (Lodd.) M.W.Chase & N.H.Williams (2009)
 Gomesa foliosa  (Hook.) Klotzsch ex Rchb.f. (1852)
 Gomesa forbesii  (Hook.) M.W.Chase & N.H.Williams (2009)
 Gomesa fuscans  (Rchb.f.) M.W.Chase & N.H.Williams (2009)
 Gomesa fuscopetala  (Hoehne) M.W.Chase & N.H.Williams (2009)
 Gomesa gardneri  (Lindl.) M.W.Chase & N.H.Williams (2009)
 Gomesa gilva  (Vell.) M.W.Chase & N.H.Williams (2009)
 Gomesa glaziovii  Cogn. (1905)
 Gomesa gomezoides  (Barb.Rodr.) Pabst (1967)
 Gomesa gracilis  (Lindl.) M.W.Chase & N.H.Williams (2009)
 Gomesa gravesiana  (Rolfe) M.W.Chase & N.H.Williams (2009)
 Gomesa gutfreundiana  (Chiron & V.P.Castro) M.W.Chase & N.H.Williams (2009)
 Gomesa handroi  (Hoehne) Pabst (1967)
 Gomesa herzogii  (Schltr.) Lückel (2010)
 Gomesa hookeri  (Rolfe) M.W.Chase & N.H.Williams (2009)
 Gomesa hydrophila  (Barb.Rodr.) M.W.Chase & N.H.Williams (2009)
 Gomesa imperatoris-maximiliani  (Rchb.f.) M.W.Chase & N.H.Williams (2009)
 Gomesa insignis  (Rolfe) M.W.Chase & N.H.Williams (2009)
 Gomesa isoptera  (Lindl.) M.W.Chase & N.H.Williams (2009)
 Gomesa itapetingensis  (V.P.Castro & Chiron) M.W.Chase & N.H.Williams (2009)
 Gomesa jucunda  (Rchb.f.) M.W.Chase & N.H.Williams (2009)
 Gomesa kautskyi  (Pabst) M.W.Chase & N.H.Williams (2009)
 Gomesa laxiflora  (Lindl.) Klotzsch ex Rchb.f. (1852)
 Gomesa leinigii  (Pabst) M.W.Chase & N.H.Williams (2009)
 Gomesa lietzei  (Regel) M.W.Chase & N.H.Williams (2009)
 Gomesa loefgrenii  (Cogn.) M.W.Chase & N.H.Williams (2009)
 Gomesa longicornu  (Mutel) M.W.Chase & N.H.Williams (2009)
 Gomesa longipes  (Lindl.) M.W.Chase & N.H.Williams (2009)
 Gomesa macronyx  (Rchb.f.) M.W.Chase & N.H.Williams (2009)
 Gomesa macropetala  (Lindl.) M.W.Chase & N.H.Williams (2009)
 Gomesa majevskyi  (Toscano & V.P.Castro) M.W.Chase & N.H.Williams (2009)
 Gomesa marshalliana  (Rchb.f.) M.W.Chase & N.H.Williams (2009)
 Gomesa martiana  (Lindl.) M.W.Chase & N.H.Williams (2009)
 Gomesa messmeriana  (Campacci) Laitano (2010)
 Gomesa microphyta  (Barb.Rodr.) M.W.Chase & N.H.Williams (2009)
 Gomesa micropogon  (Rchb.f.) M.W.Chase & N.H.Williams (2009)
 Gomesa montana  (Barb.Rodr.) M.W.Chase & N.H.Williams (2009)
 Gomesa neoparanaensis  M.W.Chase & N.H.Williams (2009)
 Gomesa nitida  (Barb.Rodr.) M.W.Chase & N.H.Williams (2009)
 Gomesa novaesae  (Ruschi) Fraga & A.P.Fontana, Phytotaxa 20: 57. (2011)
 Gomesa ouricanensis  (V.P.Castro & Campacci) M.W.Chase & N.H.Williams (2009)
 Gomesa pabstii  (Campacci & C.Espejo) M.W.Chase & N.H.Williams (2009)
 Gomesa paranaensis  Kraenzl. (1911)
 Gomesa paranapiacabensis  (Hoehne) M.W.Chase & N.H.Williams (2009)
 Gomesa paranensoides  M.W.Chase & N.H.Williams (2009)
 Gomesa pardoglossa  (Rchb.f.) M.W.Chase & N.H.Williams (2009)
 Gomesa pectoralis  (Lindl.) M.W.Chase & N.H.Williams (2009)
 Gomesa petropolitana  (Pabst) M.W.Chase & N.H.Williams (2009)
 Gomesa planifolia  (Lindl.) Klotzsch ex Rchb.f. (1852)
 Gomesa praetexta  (Rchb.f.) M.W.Chase & N.H.Williams (2009)
 Gomesa pubes  (Lindl.) M.W.Chase & N.H.Williams (2009)
 Gomesa pulchella  (Regel) M.W.Chase & N.H.Williams (2009)
 Gomesa radicans  (Rchb.f.) M.W.Chase & N.H.Williams (2009)
 Gomesa ramosa  (Lindl.) M.W.Chase & N.H.Williams (2009)
 Gomesa ranifera  (Lindl.) M.W.Chase & N.H.Williams (2009)
 Gomesa recurva  R.Br. (1815)
 Gomesa reducta  (Kraenzl.) M.W.Chase & N.H.Williams (2009)
 Gomesa reichertii  (L.C.Menezes & V.P.Castro) M.W.Chase & N.H.Williams (2009)
 Gomesa riograndensis  (Cogn.) M.W.Chase & N.H.Williams (2009)
 Gomesa riviereana  (Wibier) M.W.Chase & N.H.Williams (2009)
 Gomesa rupestris  (Docha Neto) Lückel (2010)
 Gomesa salesopolitana  (V.P.Castro & Chiron) M.W.Chase & N.H.Williams (2009)
 Gomesa sarcodes  (Lindl.) M.W.Chase & N.H.Williams (2009)
 Gomesa sellowii  (Cogn.) M.W.Chase & N.H.Williams (2009)
 Gomesa sessilis  Barb.Rodr. (1877)
 Gomesa silvana  (V.P.Castro & Campacci) M.W.Chase & N.H.Williams (2009)
 Gomesa sincorana  (Campacci & Cath.) M.W.Chase & N.H.Williams (2009)
 Gomesa spiloptera  (Lindl.) M.W.Chase & N.H.Williams (2009)
 Gomesa uhlii  (Chiron & V.P.Castro) M.W.Chase & N.H.Williams (2009)
 Gomesa uniflora  (Booth ex Lindl.) M.W.Chase & N.H.Williams (2009)
 Gomesa varicosa  (Lindl.) M.W.Chase & N.H.Williams (2009)
 Gomesa velteniana  (V.P.Castro & Chiron) M.W.Chase & N.H.Williams (2009)
 Gomesa venusta  (Drapiez) M.W.Chase & N.H.Williams (2009)
 Gomesa viperina  (Lindl.) M.W.Chase & N.H.Williams (2009)
 Gomesa warmingii  (Rchb.f.) M.W.Chase & N.H.Williams (2009)
 Gomesa welteri  (Pabst) M.W.Chase & N.H.Williams (2009)
 Gomesa widgrenii  (Lindl.) M.W.Chase & N.H.Williams (2009)
 Gomesa williamsii  (Schltr.) M.W.Chase & N.H.Williams (2009)
 Gomesa zappii  (Pabst) M.W.Chase & N.H.Williams (2009)

Natural Hybrids
 Gomesa × amicta  (Lindl.) M.W.Chase & N.H.Williams (2009) = (Gomes lietzei × Gomesa sarcodes)
 Gomesa × colnagoi  (Pabst) M.W.Chase & N.H.Williams (2009) = (Gomesa forbesii × Gomesa zappii)
 Gomesa × lita  (Rchb.f.) M.W.Chase & N.H.Williams (2009) = (Gomes forbesii × Gomesa imperatoris-maximiliani)
 Gomesa × scullyi  (Pabst & A.F.Mello) M.W.Chase & N.H.Williams (2009) = (Gomes gardneri × Gomesa gravesiana)
 Gomesa × terassaniana  (Campacci) J.M.H.Shaw (2011) = (Gomes blanchetii × Gomesa sarcodes)

See also 
 List of Orchidaceae genera

References 

  (1815) Botanical Magazine 42: t. 1748.
  2005. Handbuch der Orchideen-Namen. Dictionary of Orchid Names. Dizionario dei nomi delle orchidee. Ulmer, Stuttgart
  (2009). Epidendroideae (Part two). Genera Orchidacearum 5: 271 ff. Oxford University Press.
  (2009) Floral convergence in Oncidiinae (Cymbidieae; Orchidaceae): an expanded concept of Gomesa and a new genus Nohawilliamsia, Annals of Botany, 104 (3): 387–402.

External links 

Oncidiinae genera
Oncidiinae
Orchids of South America